Barrackpore Racecourse railway station is a railway station at Barrackpur Cantonment, Barrackpore in North 24 Parganas district in the Indian state of West Bengal. It is a part of the Kolkata Suburban Railway system and is under the jurisdiction of Eastern Railway. This railway station is presently abandoned and used by the Indian Army exclusively.

History
The railway station was built on a branch line originating from Barrackpore railway station in 1928 that served the Barrackpore Cantonment area. Barrackpore had a race course established by Royal Calcutta Turf Club and a special single rail track took steam engine-driven trains there, carrying British passengers who would attend the race. The line has been depreciated since and this is used by the Indian Army only.

Gallery

References

External links

Railway stations in North 24 Parganas district
Barrackpore
Kolkata Suburban Railway stations
Defunct railway stations in India